Buenos días a todos (lit: Good Morning Everyone) is a Chilean breakfast television programme aired on Televisión Nacional de Chile since March 9, 1992. The programme contains a mixture of news, interviews, weather forecasts, entertainment and traffic reports.

Hosts have included Felipe Camiroaga, Tati Penna, Jorge Hevia, Margot Kahl, Tonka Tomicic, Katherine Salosny, Carolina de Moras and Julián Elfenbein. Longtime host Felipe Camiroaga was killed in the 2011 Chilean Air Force CASA 212 crash off Robinson Crusoe Island on September 2, 2011. Journalist Roberto Bruce, who had guest hosted the show for Camiroaga just three days before the crash, was also killed.

The show ended on August 22, 2016 after 24 years of airing, it was replaced by Muy buenos días.

On October 23, 2019, the show returns to the air after 3 years off the air.

In November of the same year, Gonzalo Ramirez and Carolina Escobar, who came from 24 Horas, joined as anchors.

References

1992 Chilean television series debuts
Chilean television news shows
Chilean television talk shows
Televisión Nacional de Chile original programming
Breakfast television
1990s Chilean television series
2000s Chilean television series
2010s Chilean television series
2016 Chilean television series endings